Marc Brettler (Marc Zvi Brettler) is an American biblical scholar, and the Bernice and Morton Lerner Professor in Judaic Studies at Duke University. He earned his B.A., M.A., and PhD from Brandeis University, where he previously served as Dora Golding Professor of Biblical Studies.  He researches biblical metaphors, the Bible and gender, biblical historical texts, the book of Psalms, and the post-biblical reception of the Hebrew Bible, including in the New Testament.  He is a co-founder of the website thetorah.com, which integrates critical and traditional methods of studying the Bible.

In 2004, Brettler won the National Jewish Book Award for The Jewish Study Bible.

Books 
 The Bible With and Without Jesus: How Jews and Christians Read the Same Stories Differently, with Amy-Jill Levine, San Francisco: HarperOne, 2020. 
 The Bible and the Believer: How to Read the Bible Critically and Religiously, with Peter Enns and Daniel J. Harrington, New York: Oxford University Press, 2012 (reprint edition 2015). 
 The Jewish Annotated New Testament, with Amy-Jill Levine, New York: Oxford University Press, 2011 (second edition 2017). 
 How to Read the Bible, Philadelphia: Jewish Publication Society of America, 2005 (republished with minor revisions as How to Read the Jewish Bible, New York: Oxford University Press, 2007). 
 The Jewish Study Bible, with Adele Berlin, New York: Oxford University Press 2004 (second edition 2014). 
 The Book of Judges: Old Testament Readings, London: Routledge, 2001. 
 Biblical Hebrew for Students of Modern Hebrew, New Haven: Yale University Press, 2001. 
 The Creation of History in Ancient Israel, London: Routledge Press, 1995 (paperback 1998). 
 God is King: Understanding an Israelite Metaphor, Sheffield: Sheffield Academic Press, 1989 (republished 2009).

References 

Year of birth missing (living people)
Living people
Jewish biblical scholars
American biblical scholars
Brandeis University faculty
Brandeis University alumni
20th-century Jewish biblical scholars
21st-century Jewish biblical scholars

Jewish American academics
Duke University faculty